Neeraj Madhav (born 26 March 1990), also known by his stage name NJ is an Indian actor, rapper and dancer who predominantly works in Malayalam films. Neeraj is most popular for his role as Moosa Rehman in the Amazon prime web series The Family Man. 

He is also known  for his roles in Drishyam (2013), 1983 (2014), Sapthamashree Thaskaraha (2014), Oru Vadakkan Selfie (2015), Adi Kapyare Kootamani (2015), Oru Mexican Aparatha (2017) and Vendhu Thanindhathu Kaadu (2022).

Early life
Neeraj is a native of Calicut district in Kerala. He did his schooling from St. Joseph's Boys' Higher Secondary School, Calicut. Then graduated in Visual communications from SRM Institute of Science and Technology, Kanchipuram and later did post-graduation in Theatre from School of Drama and Fine Arts, Thrissur. His father Dr. K. Madhavan is a veterinarian, and his mother Latha, a teacher.

The young talent started off as a dancer with the first edition of reality television programme ‘Super Dancer’ on Amrita TV and made it to the final round. Neeraj is also a trained Bharatanatyam dancer, having learned it under Kalamandalam Saraswathy and her daughter, Aswathy. He is also trained in chenda and is a disciple of Kalanilayam Udayan Namboodiri.

Neeraj has a younger brother Navneeth Madhav, another dancer turned actor in the family. He has acted in films such as Shikkar, Kottarathil Kutty Bhootham,Nallavan and Manikyakkallu and TV series such as Kuttichathan.

Career
Neeraj made his entry to the Malayalam cinema industry through Raaj Prabavathy Menon's Buddy into which he was selected through an audition. He was later noticed by director Jeethu Joseph and was invited to be a part of his movies Memories and Drishyam, both turned out to be box office successes, with the latter becoming the highest-grossing Malayalam film ever. Meanwhile, Neeraj also acted in Abrid Shine's 1983 and Sathyan Anthikad's Oru Indian Pranayakadha.

Anil Radhakrishnan Menon's Sapthamashree Thaskaraha - the story of seven thieves in which Neeraj plays one of the lead characters alongside Prithviraj, Anoop Kannan's Homely Meals and Apothecary (film) - a medical drama directed by Madhav Ramadasan are also other noted performances of the actor.

Neeraj also debuted as an official choreographer through Oru Vadakkan Selfie, scripted by Vineeth Sreenivasan, with the fun song "Enne thallendammava". His other releases in 2015 also include Jamna Pyari, Kunjiramayanam, Madhura Naranga, KL.10 Pathu, Charlie and Adi Kapyare Kootamani.

The movie Oozham, which has Prithviraj in the lead, has Neeraj in a full-length role. Neeraj also portrayed a pivotal role in Tom Emmatty's Oru Mexican Aparatha.

Neeraj debuted as a screenplay writer through the movie Lavakusha in 2017 and also played one of the title characters in this along with Aju Varghese.

Neeraj plays his first lead role in the movie Paippin Chuvattile Pranayam. It was directed by debutant Domin D'Silva. He portrays Govindankutty, a daily wage laborer in this movie.

In 2019, Neeraj starred as the main antagonist, Moosa Rehman in the web series titled The Family Man. This action-drama series by Amazon Prime Video is helmed and produced by director duo Raj and DK. The series also stars Manoj Bajpayee, Priyamani and Kishore in major roles.

In July 2020, he released a rap song titled "Pani Paali".

Personal life 
Neeraj is the son of Dr. K. Raghavan and Latha Madhavan. He married his long time girlfriend Deepthi on April 2, 2018, who is also a native of Kozhikode. The couple has a daughter born in 2021.

Filmography

All films are in Malayalam language unless otherwise noted.

Films

Web series

Other works

As choreographer

As screenwriter

Discography

Awards and nominations
Asianet Film Awards
2018 – Won – Best Star Pair – Paippin Chuvattile Pranayam
Asiavision Awards
 2015 – Won – New Sensation in Acting (Male) for performance in various movies

North American Film Awards
 2016 – Special mention by the jury for performance in various movies
 2017 – Special mention by the jury for performance in Paippin Chuvattile Pranayam

References

External links
 
 
 

1987 births
Living people
Male actors from Kozhikode
Male actors in Malayalam cinema
Indian male film actors
21st-century Indian male actors